A list of alumni of note from Oxford Brookes University in Oxford, England.

Edward Abel – cricketer
Maitha Al Mahrouqi – Undersecretary for Tourism in Oman
Masih Alinejad – Iranian-American journalist, author, and women's rights activist
Adeel Akhtar – actor, and BAFTA award winner.
Peace Anyiam-Osigwe – lawyer and the founder of Africa Movie Academy Awards.
 Lady Margarita Armstrong-Jones – granddaughter of Princess Margaret and grand-niece of Queen Elizabeth II
Prince Azim of Brunei (1982–2020)
Daniel Battsek – film producer and executive
Freddie Boath – former actor, now marketing and advertising professional,
Aimé Boji – Democratic Republic of the Congo Budget Minister
Burna Boy – Musician
Duncan Bradshaw – cricketer
Caroline Davis (publishing)
Liam Brown – author
Beatrice Catanzaro – Italian artist
Richard Chambers – Olympic rower and World Champion 2007, 2010
Millie Clode – Sky Sports News presenter
Paul Conneally – poet, artist and educationalist
Ed Cowan – cricketer
Graham Francis Defries – lawyer and cartoonist
Jonathan Djanogly – Conservative MP
Afi Ekong – Nigerian artist, arts promoter
Robert Evans – writer
Lynne Featherstone – former Liberal Democrat MP; Parliamentary Under-Secretary of State for International Development
Justin Forsyth – Chief Executive of Save the Children
Andy Gomarsall MBE – England rugby union player
Dave Goulson – biologist
Jonny Greenwood – founding member of Radiohead
Jonathan Gullis – Conservative MP for Stoke-on-Trent North
Patrick Hall – former MP
Alastair Heathcote – GB rower, Olympic silver medal 2008
Melody Hossaini – youth sector consultant; candidate on The Apprentice series seven
Marc Hudson – vocalist for the band DragonForce
Aaron Jeavons – cricketer
Tom Johnson – England Rugby Union player
Islam Karimov Jnr. – grandson of the President of Uzbekistan
Chris Kelly – Conservative Member of Parliament for Dudley South
Alexander James Kent – President of the British Cartographic Society and advisor to UNESCO
Yasmeen Lari – first woman architect in Pakistan and advisor to UNESCO
Tom Lucy – Welsh rower, silver medallist at the 2008 Summer Olympics
David Mayer de Rothschild – environmentalist
Caroline O'Connor – rowing cox
Adaora Onyechere, Nigerian TV/radio presenter, entrepreneur, motivational speaker and author
Jay Osgerby – designer, co-designer of the London 2012 Olympic Torch
Alex Partridge – rower, member of winning coxless four, World Rowing Championships 2005 and 2006
Annabel Port – radio broadcaster
George Pringle – musician and artist
Gilbert Proesch – artist, of Gilbert & George
Adrian Reynard – motorsport driver and entrepreneur
Steve Ridgway – CEO of Virgin Atlantic
Matt Richardson – comedian and presenter
Susan Roaf – Architect of Oxford Ecohouse with the first photovoltaic cell roof installed in Britain
Georgina Rylance – actress
Gurdeep Samra – music producer
Carly Schabowski – author
Prince Shivraj Singh – Crown Prince of Jodhpur; polo player
Michael Fenton Stevens – actor
Roma Tearne – artist, novelist and filmmaker
Justin Tomlinson – Conservative Member of Parliament for North Swindon
Guillaume Veillet – French ethnomusicologist and music writer
Steve Williams MBE – twice Olympic gold medal winner in rowing, 2004 and 2008
Richard Younger-Ross – Liberal Democrat Member of Parliament for Teignbridge
Louis Ng – Member of Parliament (MP) for Nee Soon Group Representation Constituency (GRC) (Singapore Parliament Constituency)

References

External links
 Oxford Brookes University Alumni website (university)
 Oxford Brookes University Alumni website

Oxford Brookes University
Oxford-related lists